The 28 cm K L/40 "Kurfürst" (K - Kanone (Cannon) L - Länge (with a 40 caliber barrel), Kurfürst (Elector) was a German railroad gun that served on the Western Front in 1918 during World War I. Originally a naval gun, it was adapted for land service when its original ships began to be disarmed beginning in 1915. All six built were destroyed postwar according to the terms of the Treaty of Versailles.

Design
The 28 cm MRK L/40 was a built-up gun made from three layers of reinforcing hoops. It used a cylindro-prismatic horizontal sliding breech, but unlike later Krupp guns it did not use a metallic cartridge case. Instead, it used separate loading bagged charges and projectiles. Six guns were mounted on the Eisenbahn und Bettungsschiessgerüst (E. u. B.) (railroad and firing platform) mounts successfully used by other German railroad guns. Unlike every other large German railroad gun, it used a massive rectangular cradle for its gun.

The E. u. B. could fire from any suitable section of track after curved wedges were bolted to the track behind each wheel to absorb any residual recoil after the gun cradle recoiled backwards. It also had a pintle built into the underside of the front of the mount. Two large rollers were fitted to the underside of the mount at the rear. Seven cars could carry a portable metal firing platform (Bettungslafette) that had a central pivot mount and an outer rail. It was assembled with the aid of a derrick or crane, which took between three and five days, and railroad tracks were laid slightly past the firing platform to accommodate the front bogies of the gun. The gun was moved over the firing platform and then lowered into position after the central section of rail was removed. After the gun's pintle was bolted to the firing platform's pivot mount, the entire carriage was jacked up so that the trucks and their sections of rail could be removed. The carriage was then lowered so that the rear rollers rested on the outer track. Concrete versions were also used. It could have up to 360° of traverse. The E. u. B. retained 4° of on-mount traverse for fine aiming adjustments.

Ammunition
Ammunition was moved by means of an overhead rail from which a shell trolley carried individual shells to be placed in the loading tray fixed to the breech. An extensible rail could raised and braced in place to allow the shell trolley to reach shells placed on the ground or in an ammunition car behind the mount. This ammunition car sometimes had its own overhead rail to move the shells forward to where the trolley in the mount could reach it through a hatch in the roof. The shell and powder were manually rammed into the gun. The gun had to be loaded at zero elevation and thus needed to be re-aimed between each shot.

Combat History
The six "Kurfürst" guns entered service in early 1918, participating in the German spring offensive and the subsequent defensive operations. They were organized into Batteries 393, 434, 722 and the First through Third Batteries of Bavarian Foot Artillery Battalion (1.-3./Bayerische Fußartillerie-Batallion) 29 with one gun each. All six were destroyed in 1921–22 by the Military Inter-Allied Commission of Control.

Notes

References 
 François, Guy. Eisenbahnartillerie: Histoire de l'artillerie lourd sur voie ferrée allemande des origines à 1945. Paris: Editions Histoire et Fortifications, 2006
 
 Jäger, Herbert. German Artillery of World War One. Ramsbury, Marlborough, Wiltshire: Crowood Press, 2001 
 Kosar, Franz. Eisenbahngeschütz der Welt. Stuttgart: Motorbook, 1999 
 Miller, H. W., Lt. Col. Railway Artillery: A Report on the Characteristics, Scope of Utility, Etc., of Railway Artillery, Volume I Washington: Government Print Office, 1921

External links

World War I railway artillery of Germany
280 mm artillery